Ludevít Grmela (born 16 April 1961) is a Czech football manager and former player. He is currently the head coach of Vítkovice.

External links
 fotbal.idnes.cz
 

1961 births
Living people
Czech footballers
Czech expatriate footballers
Czech First League players
Cypriot First Division players
FC Zbrojovka Brno players
AEL Limassol players
Expatriate footballers in Cyprus
Czech football managers
Association football midfielders